"Estoy Con Él y Pienso En Ti" (English: I'm With Him and Think of You) is a song performed by Dominican-American singer-songwriter Anaís. The song is the third single from his debut studio album Así Soy Yo (2006). The song charted in the top ten of the "Hot Latin Tracks" chart, peaking at number 7, and in the top 5 of the Tropical charts, becoming Anaís' second top 10 hit. Anaís has said that the song is her personal favorite from her album.

The song is talking about how although Anaís is with one man, she is actually thinking of another one. On her album, the song also featured a salsa and a reggaeton remix. There was also a Duranguense version of the song made, although it was not featured on the album.

Charts

Music video
The video starts with Anaís on a date with a man who appears to be her boyfriend. As the video goes on, you see her continuously fighting with him, and she is continuously fantasizing about being with another man. We see this "other man" holding up romantic signs for her and doing various romantic things.

2006 singles
2006 songs
Spanish-language songs
Anaís Martínez songs
Univision Music Group singles
2000s ballads
Latin ballads
Pop ballads